"Getting Down the Germs" is a solo track by Gerard Way, released as a single on October 26, 2018. The song was written in collaboration with Ray Toro. Flutist Sara Andon and producer Doug McKean are also listed as collaborators.

Background 
In a statement Way said, “I had really been wanting a song that featured the flute prominently for quite some time. It sits in there perfectly, like it was made to pay the song a visit. The whole song reminds me of wiggling squiggling wormy germs. It’s a very calm affair that shows a peek into where I may be heading musically.”

In an interview Way explained, "‘Getting Down The Germs’ means getting down, or swallowing the harder things in life. But in a positive way — taking the bad with the good. I find it interesting how a phrase can mean a whole other thing in the context of a song."

Critical reception 
Graham Hartman of Loudwire stated the song was a "stripped-down, feel-good song reminiscent of ’60s psychedelic music and new school indie rock." Billboard released a review on Friday stating Way "stays true to his punk rock roots", while giving the listener tastes of "the great rock-music flute solos of the '60s and '70s".

Music video 
The lyric video, directed by Claire Marie Vogel, was released on November 15, 2018. It shows puppets fashioned as germs dancing to the song.

Personnel
 Gerard Way – lead and backing vocals, rhythm guitar
 Matt Gorney – bass guitar
 Ian Fowles – lead guitar
 James Dewees – keyboards
 Tom Rasulo – drums, percussion
 Sara Andon – flute

References 

2018 singles
Gerard Way songs
Songs written by Gerard Way
Songs written by Ray Toro
2018 songs
Reprise Records singles